Duy Xuyên is a district (huyện) of Quảng Nam province in the South Central Coast region of Vietnam. As of 2003 the district had a population of 129,616. The district covers an area of 298 km2. The district capital lies at Nam Phước.

References

External links
Website

Districts of Quảng Nam province